Cheongsam, also known as the qipao and sometimes referred to as the mandarin gown, is a Chinese dress worn by women which takes inspiration from the , the ethnic clothing of the Manchu people. The cheongsam is most often seen as a longer, figure-fitting, one piece garment with a standing collar, an asymmetric, left-over-right opening and two side slits, and embellished with Chinese frog fasteners on the lapel and the collar. It was developed in the 1920s and evolved in shapes and design over years. It was popular in China from the 1920s to 1940s, overlapping with the Republican era, and was popularized by Chinese socialites and high society women in Shanghai. Although the cheongsam is sometimes seen as traditional Chinese clothing, the cheongsam continues to evolve with times as it responds to the contemporary modern life.

Terminology 
As English loanwords, both "cheongsam" and "qipao" describe the same type of body-hugging dress worn by Chinese women, and the words could be used interchangeably.

The term cheongsam is a romanization of Cantonese word , which comes from the Shanghainese term . In Cantonese and Shanghainese, the term is used to describe a Chinese dress popularized in Shanghai. In Hong Kong, where many Shanghainese tailors fled after the communist revolution of 1949, the word  became gender-neutral, referring to both male and female garments.

The word qipao, which literally means "Bannerman robe" and originally referred to a loose-fitting, trapezoidal-cut garment worn by both Manchu men and women, became a more formal term for the female . Usage of the term "cheongsam" in Western countries mostly followed the original Cantonese meaning and applies to the dress worn by women only.

Design and construction 

The design of the cheongsam has evolved with time; and there are now a various styles of cheongsam. However, after decades of development, the design of cheongsam itself can be roughly categorized into the Beijing style, the Shanghai style, and the Hong Kong style.

General characteristics and features 
The cheongsam is typically a tight-fitting dress, with a pair of high side slits above the knee-level. The length of the cheongsam can vary; it can be either long or short. It is more often seen with short sleeves; however, it can also be sleeveless.

Collars and neckline 

It is typically found with the mandarin collar and has asymmetric closure which runs from the central collar across the top area of the chest to the armhole curing down to the right side. However, the cheongsam is not limited to the asymmetrical  closure; there are various styles of cheongsam necklines, including a symmetrical opening in the chest area.

Fasteners and closures 
The fasteners uses traditional Chinese knotting craftwork with the use of the  fastening and Chinese button knot.

Edges and piping 

The cheongsam is typically edged with piping, especially at the collar and the closure.

Other double-edged piping technique include “two--one-” and the “two--two-”.

Fabric and textile 

Different materials can be used in the making of the cheongsam, such as wool, silk (including silk floss, damask, brocade, satin), or silk-like materials. The cheongsam can also be unlined or interlined. The fabric of the cheongsam can decorated with a diversity of decorative motifs, which can be embroidered on the dress.

Main styles 

The Beijing-style cheongsam originated in Beijing and is fairly traditional and conservative. It is typically handmade. It maintains the traditional straight and A-line silhouette which flattens the curves of the female figure; embroidery and elaborate adornments are considered desirable. It is also characterized by its wide piping. Therefore, the Beijing-style cheongsam expresses the beauty of Chinese culture in its style; it gives the wearer a reserved, concise, gorgeous, and dignified appearance. Although it appears to use simple lines, the production process is complex. The  fasteners can sometimes take several days to create, typically requiring twenty-six procedures of silk processing to be turning into silk strips which would be appropriate in the making of the fasteners of various patterns by skilled artisans.

The Shanghai-style Cheongsam originated in Shanghai and is a popular and dominant style. The Shanghai-style Cheongsam, especially, conveyed progressive messages of female body emancipation from the 1930s to 1940s; it also came to symbolize the idea of modernity in "pursuing health, fashion, and natural beauty". As a result, to deliberately create a more figure-hugging silhouette and to focus on showing off the natural curve of the female body, many elements of Western tailoring techniques can be found in the Shanghai-style cheongsam, including curved cutting, waist darts. This act of showing the female body was a physical expression of the changes in the identities of Chinese women and their rebellion against the idealized womanhood as indicated in the Confucian ideology. It also features high side slits and high collar. The collars can be lapel collars, water drop collars, and lotus leaf collars; the shape of the sleeves are also diverse. It also uses lighter materials and is less elaborate embroidery or adornments; the piping is very narrow.

The Jiangnan-style cheongsam, also known as Su-style cheongsam, originated in the Jiangnan Water town. This style of cheongsam expresses the cultural characteristics of the water town in Jiangnan and also creates a fusion between the beauty of Chinese calligraphy and Chinese painting, incorporating the hand-painting art of the Wumen School of Painting. It is characterized by the sophisticated neckline and embroidered patterns on the edges of the cuff. The dress is also embroidered with rich pattern motifs which tend to be floral, e.g. plum, orchid, bamboo, chrysanthemum, peonies, and roses. The fabrics used tend to be high-quality soft satin and plain crepe satin, etc.

History

Background 

The Manchu are an ethnic minority that founded the last of China's imperial dynasties, the Qing dynasty, which lasted from 1644 to 1911. When the dynasty was first established, dress regulations were implemented as a way of expressing their identity as a people and creating social order. They used an administrative division called the Eight Banner system. Originally only the Manchu households were organized within this system, but over time naturalized Mongols and Han Chinese were incorporated. The Manchu, and anyone living under the Eight Banners system, wore different clothing from ordinary civilians. Thus, they became known as the Banner People.

The  and the  differed in terms of structure: the  had two high side slits which allowed for greater ease of movements while the  had no side slits. It is also theorized that the cheongsam was derived from the Manchu women's  although the  shows the absence of slits.

Introduction of Manchu-style clothing 

Throughout China's multicultural history, clothing has been shaped through an intermingling of Han clothing styles, the Han Chinese being the dominant ethnicity, and the styles of various ethnic groups. Some examples include the standing collar of the cheongsam, which has been found in relics from the Ming dynasty, ruled by the Han Chinese, and was subsequently adopted in the Qing dynasty as Manchu clothing items. Manchu robes were initially collarless. The Manchu also adopted the right closure from the Han Chinese as they initially closed their robes on the left side.

Under the dynastic laws of transition from Ming to Qing, all Han Chinese were forced to adopt the Manchu male queue hairstyle and adopt Manchu clothing under the  policy instead of being wearing the traditional  under the threat of death penalty. However, the order for ordinary non-Banner Han civilians to wear Manchu clothing was lifted, and only those Han who served as officials or scholars were required to wear them. Over time though, some Han civilian men voluntarily adopted the changshan. By the late Qing, not only officials and scholars, but a great many Han commoners wore Manchu-style male attire. However, until 1911, the Manchu changpao was required clothing for Chinese men of a certain class.

What is now known as the Chinese changshan was developed by the Han Chinese during the Qing dynasty. The Qing dynasty Chinese changshan started to be worn by the Han Chinese after the Manchu conquest; the Chinese changshan was a modified version of the changshan worn in the Ming dynasty (1368–1644 AD), the preceding dynasty before the Qing dynasty. The Qing dynasty Chinese changshan was modelled after the Manchu's men's robe. It thus adopted certain Manchu  Manchu elements, such as by slimming their changshan, by adopting the  collar of the Manchu, and by using buttons and loops at the neck and sides. The Chinese changshan differed from the Manchu men's neitao as it only had two slits on the sides lacking the central front and back slits and lacked the presence of the  cuffs; the sleeves were also longer than the ones found in the neitao.

For women, Manchu and Han systems of clothing coexisted. Throughout the Qing dynasty, Han civilian women could wear traditional Han clothing from the Ming dynasty. As a result, Ming dynasty style clothing was preserved to an extend in China until the Xinhai Revolution of 1911.

Birth of the cheongsam 

In the late 1910s, after the overthrow of the Qing dynasty and the founding of the Republic of China, women began to partake in the education system. They wore an early form of the cheongsam, which quickly became the regular outfit of urban women in metropolitan cities like Beijing and Shanghai. Cheongsam of the late 1910s and early 1920s had relatively loose cutting with long, wide sleeves. One of the earliest cheongsams was A-line with wide three-quarter sleeves and would fall just below the knee level.

Under the Western influences of wearing shorter dresses in 1928, the length of the cheongsam became shorter. In 1929, the cheongsam was chosen by the Republic of China government to be one of the country's national dresses. With the designation of "national dress", the Republic of China government also promulgated the new Clothing Regulations of 1929, which specified the cheongsam should be worn with trousers and be calf-length. However, even before the Clothing Regulations of 1929, women had already stopped wearing  trousers in favor of silk stockings. Chinese women held no respect to the rule, as it was seen as an attempt by the Republican government to control individual rights and woman's liberty.

From the 1920s onwards, the cheongsam was quickly popularized by celebrities, socialites, and politicians in Shanghai. Former First Lady of China Madame Wellington Koo (Oei Hui-lan) was a prominent figure among them. Voted several times by Vogue into its lists of the world's best-dressed women, Madame Wellington Koo was much admired for her adaptations of the traditional Manchu fashion, which she wore with lace trousers and jade necklaces. Cheongsam dresses at the time had been decorously slit a few inches up the sides, but Madame Koo slashed hers to the knee, 'with lace pantelettes just visible to the ankle'. Unlike other Asian socialites, Madame Koo also insisted on local Chinese silks, which she thought were of superior quality.

Further transformation 

Starting from the early 1930s, there was a further transformation of the qipao as it became increasingly shorter, tighter, and body-hugging, with side slits that reached up to the thigh. Moreover, numerous distinct cheongsams designs emerged, with experimental changes on fastenings, pipings, collars, fur-lined cuffs, various length of sleeves, or simply sleeveless.

Consumer culture rose as Western and Chinese merchants cooperated to move towards early capitalism. People eagerly sought a more modernized dress style and transformed the old cheongsam to suit new tastes. Newer forms featured slender and tight-fitting pencil cuts and deep necks, which is different from the early cheongsam. High-class courtesans and celebrities in the city welcomed the tight-fitting cheongsam. It was at this time the word cheongsam became well-known in English.

Trousers had completely fallen out of use, replaced by different types of hosiery. High-heeled shoes were popularized in the Shanghai fashion scene in the 1930s. Stockings and High-heeled shoes became an essential part of the cheongsam fashion set, which spawned new side slits designs reaching the hip line, intended to display the hosiery and heels. As Western fashions evolved, so did the cheongsam design, introducing high-necked sleeveless dresses, bell-like sleeves, and the black lace frothing at the hem of a ball gown. By the 1940s, cheongsam came in a wide variety of fabrics with an equal variety of accessories.

In late 20th century 
Cheongsams were worn by celebrities, societies, and students of prestigious missionary schools in the early 20th century. As a result, the cheongsam-style uniform was regarded as an icon of the wealthy class and was perceived as Bourgeois by the Communist China. From the 1950s to the 1970s, with the destroying Four Olds movements and the Chinese Cultural Revolution (1966–1976), China pushed for egalitarian ideology and wearing cheongsam can result in punishment. For example, in 1963, when Chinese President Liu Shaoqi visited four neighbouring countries in South Asia, the first lady Wang Guangmei wore a cheongsam. She was later declared guilty in the Cultural Revolution for wearing the cloth due to its historical ties and symbologies.

In other Chinese communities, such as Taiwan, Malaysia, Singapore and Hong Kong, the cheongsam remained popular after the war. It became everyday wear in the British colony of Hong Kong in the 1950s, and leather clutch, high heels, and white gloves were common pairing accessories. However, the popularity ultimately declined in the 1970s, giving way for cheaper and mass-produced Western-style clothing.

Since the 1980s, with the trend of reevaluation of Chinese traditional culture, people in mainland China started to pay attention to the cheongsam again. The cheongsam is gaining popularity in films, beauty pageants, and fashion shows in both China and other countries all over the world. In 1984, the cheongsam was specified as the formal attire of female diplomatic agents by the People's Republic of China.

Modern use

Workplace 

Some airlines in Mainland China and Taiwan, such as China Airlines and Hainan Airlines, have cheongsam uniforms for their women flight attendants and ground workers. These uniform cheongsams are in a plain color, hemmed just above the knee, with a close-fitting wool suit jacket of the same color as the cheongsam. It is also common for these uniforms to only borrow certain elements, such as the standing collar and frog clasps, without adopting the whole design.
In the 1950s, women in the workforce in Hong Kong started to wear more functional cheongsam made of wool, twill, and other materials. Most were tailor fitted and often came with a matching jacket. The dresses were a fusion of Chinese tradition with modern styles. Cheongsam was commonly replaced by more comfortable clothing such as sweaters, jeans, business suits, and skirts. Due to its restrictive nature, it is now mainly worn as formal wear for important occasions. They are sometimes worn by politicians and film artists in Taiwan and Hong Kong. They are shown in some Chinese movies, such as in the 1960s film The World of Suzie Wong, where actress Nancy Kwan made the cheongsam briefly fashionable in Western culture. They are also commonly seen in beauty contests, along with swimsuits. Today, cheongsam is only commonly worn day to day as a uniform by people like restaurant hostesses and serving staff at luxury hotels.

School uniform 
Before World War II, it was customary for girl students who attended schools run by Western missionaries societies to wear cheongsam as their school uniforms; on the other hand, there were very few indigenous Chinese schools that were using the cheongsam as a school uniform.

A few primary schools and some secondary schools in Hong Kong, especially older schools established by Christian missionaries, use a plain-rimmed sky-blue cotton and/or dark blue velvet (for winter) cheongsam with the metal school badge right under the stand-up collar to be closed with a metal hook and eye as the official uniform for their female students. The schools which use this standard include True Light Girls' College, St. Paul's Co-educational College, Heep Yunn School, St. Stephen's Girls' College, Ying Wa Girls' School, etc. These cheongsams are usually straight, with no waist shaping, and the cheongsam hem must reach mid-thigh. The cheongsam fit closely to the neck, and the stiff collar is hooked closed, despite the tropical humid and hot weather. Although the skirts have short slits, they are too narrow to allow students to walk in long strides. The seams above the slits often split when walking and are repeatedly sewn. Many schools also require underskirts to be worn with the cheongsam. The underskirt is a white cotton full slip, hemmed slightly shorter than the cheongsam, and has slits at the sides like the cheongsam, although the slits are deeper. A white cotton undershirt is often worn underneath the cheongsam. The cheongsam's length, styling, color, and sleeve length vary between schools. Many students feel it is an ordeal, yet it is a visible manifestation of the strict discipline that is the hallmark of prestigious secondary schools in Hong Kong, and many students and their parents like that. Some rebellious students express dissatisfaction with this tradition by wearing their uniform with the stand-up collar intentionally left unhooked or hemmed above their knees. The Ying Wa and True Light Schools have sent questionnaires to their students about uniform reforms but have not altered their policies. However, Madam Lau Kam Lung Secondary School of Miu Fat Buddhist Monastery ended their cheongsam uniform in 1990 after receiving suggestions from its student union.

Festivities 
Cheongsams are a popular outfit choice for festive seasons like Chinese New Year. In countries with significant Chinese populations, such as Malaysia, Singapore, Hong Kong, and Taiwan, it is common for women to have new cheongsams tailored in preparation for the New Year. Cheongsams are also popular outfits for older women on formal occasions or family reunions. Upmarket fashion labels such as Shanghai Tang specialize in modern versions of the cheongsam as occasion wear.

Weddings 

In Western weddings, Chinese brides or brides marrying into a Chinese family will often wear cheongsam for a portion of the wedding day. It is common for many brides to have both a traditional white wedding dress and a cheongsam or a guaqun (another kind of wedding attire) to be worn during the tea ceremony. Cheongsam styles have also evolved to be more modern, from mermaid silhouettes to semi-traditional styles that feature a cheongsam top with softer details like lace and a looser skirt.

Lolita fashion 

Some Lolita dresses are styled like cheongsam. The dresses or jumper skirts are designed after traditional Chinese dresses. This style of Lolita fashion is called Qi Lolita.

On the international stage

Sport-related 
In the 2008 Summer Olympics, the medal bearers wore cheongsam. Similar attire was worn by female members of the Swedish team and of the Spanish team in the opening ceremony, with the national colors.

For the 2012 Hong Kong Sevens tournament, sportswear brand Kukri Sports teamed up with Hong Kong lifestyle retail store G.O.D. to produce merchandising, which included traditional Chinese jackets and cheongsam-inspired ladies' polo shirts.

Political stage 

In contemporary China, the meaning of cheongsam has been revisited again. It now embodies an identity of being ethnic Chinese and thus is used for important diplomatic occasions.

Since 2013, Peng Liyuan, the first lady of China, has worn cheongsam several times while on foreign visits with Chinese leader Xi Jinping.

In November 2014, cheongsam was the official attire for the political leaders' wives in the 22nd APEC meeting in Beijing.

International fashion 

With the growth of the Chinese economy, cheongsam has experienced a renewed popularity. Many Western designers have integrated elements of cheongsam in their fashion collections. French designer Pierre Cardin once said that cheongsam was his inspiration for many of his evening dress designs. In many films and movies, cheongsam is used to make a fashion statement. The varied interpretations of this ethnic dress brings in debates of cultural appropriation and the designs being linked to Orientalism. In the 2011 movie One Day, Anne Hathaway wore a set of dark blue cheongsam as evening dress. Many western stars such as Elizabeth Taylor, Grace Kelly, Nicole Kidman, Paris Hilton, Emma Watson, Deepika Padukone, and Celine Dion have also made public appearances wearing cheongsam.

Cultural and historical significance 
It was eventually accepted by the People's Republic of China as a form of hanfu, thus becoming transnational and representative of a generic Chinese national identity rather than an ethnic or ancestral identity.

The cheongsam can be worn by people of all ages and at any season. It is also used as a style Traditional Chinese wedding dress among many others. For overseas Chinese, the cheongsam has often used as a form of emblematic culture.

In the 1920s, the cheongsam was originally an embodiment of Chinese women's rebellion and a heroic gesture and a marker of Chinese feminism and Chinese women's emancipation.

Roles in Chinese nationalism and women's liberation 
The Republican period is the golden age of the cheongsam. In exploring the reasons behind its prevalence in Republic of China, many scholars relate it to the women's liberation movements. After the feudal Qing dynasty was overturned, Chinese feminists called for women's liberation from traditional roles. They led several movements against the Neo-Confucian gender segregation, including the termination of foot binding for women, cutting off long hair, which was conventionally symbolized as women's "oriental" beauty, and encouraging women to wear men's one-piece clothing, Changshan or "changpao".

"Changpao" was traditionally taken as men's patent throughout the long history since Han dynasty (202 BC to 220) to Qing dynasty (1616–1911). During that time, Chinese Han female's clothing gradually developed into two pieces. Women were forbidden to wear robes as men did and instead had to wear tops and bottoms known as "Liang jie yi". After the Xinhai Revolution of 1911 (which overthrew the Qing dynasty), young Chinese people began to learn Western science and cultures in order to seek a way of saving the nation. Also, the opening of several ports and ceding territories of China to Western powers imported some Western ideas to mainland China. Among all these Western thoughts, the idea of gender equality quickly gained its followers, among whom young female students became its prime advocates.

It was the May Thirteenth Movement of 1925, where anti-Westernization demonstrations persisted throughout the country, that served as an important push for the qipao's institutionalization. The Republicans declared the qipao a formal dress in the Clothing Regulations of 1929. The dress was meant to assert the importance of nationalism by rejecting Western forms of dress. That being said, there were still strict rules regulating how the dress needed to be worn, including specifications about length, material, accessories, collar, buttons, and sleeves, but curiously enough, none of these were followed.

From the start, there was no unifying style for the dress like the Republicans intended; Chinese women had no respect for the Clothing Regulations of 1929, which tried to control individuality. There were endless variations in style, with adaptations to length, material, hemlines, collars, fabrics, patterns, colors, and pairing accessories. It was worn by everyone from Shanghai socialites to students, housewives, and prostitutes. The style of the qipao was often in tune with fashion cycles and was influenced by Western trends seen through women styling it with matching scarves, fur coats, and leather heels. Magazines such as LingLong also gave women access to dressmaking knowledge and normalized it for women to make their dresses in their style. The base form of the qipao is rather simple to sew, which makes it easily accessible and economical.

The style of cheongsam also varied due to Western influence. It changed from a wide and loose style to a more form-fitting and revealing cut, which put more emphasis on women's body lines. The length of the cheongsam was also reduced from the ankle reaching to above the knee.

The design of the cheongsam got various inventions like ruffled collars, bell-like sleeves, and black lace frothing. Starting from that, the priority of cheongsam moved from a political expression to an aesthetic and ornamental emphasis.

Intangible cultural heritage 
Due to its long history dating back to the Manchu clothing of the early Qing dynasty, the Beijing-style cheongsam-making technique is listed as a city-level intangible cultural heritage.

The Hongkong Cheongsam-making technique is unique due to its historical background, having incorporated both Eastern and Western clothing designs before giving the Hongkong-style cheongsam its distinctive looks. In 2021, the Hong Kong cheongsam making technique was successfully listed on the fifth National List of Intangible Cultural Heritage.

Authenticity as ethnic wear 
In Western countries, the cheongsam is widely perceived as being a quintessential Chinese garment. However, the cheongsam is a type of Chinese clothing which was developed in the 20th century under the influences of several cultures, including Western culture, Manchu culture, and the Han Chinese culture. The cheongsam also had a significant impact on international fashion centers in the 1950s and 1960s, such as Paris, Rome, and New York, due to its perceived exoticism and its slim line silhouette which was also fashionable in Europe at those times.

The use of cheongsam as a cultural marker of Chineseness can be thus perceived as ironic, and a cultural stereotype of Chineseness as the cheongsam is not associated with any specific ancestral clothing of Chinese immigrants.

Appreciation and rejection in overseas Chinese community 
The cheongsam was introduced in Canada after the early 1930s with the flow of Chinese immigrants. However, the wearing the cheongsam is mixed amongst Canadians with Chinese heritage. Some may be reluctant to wear it publicly due to their experiences of being part of a racialized group and/or due to self-loathing due to the experiences of racism and marginalization in various forms, such as physical attacks, ostracism, and bullying, the social pressure to integrate and/or the desire to assimilate in the dominant culture as a protective mechanism even at the expense of rejecting any aspects or association with Chinese culture, identity, and appearance in the dress. Others may wear the cheongsam as an attempt to reconnect with their Chinese heritage and/or to show appreciation to the dress. Some may find themselves uncomfortable or feel alienation when wearing cheongsam due to the lack of self-identification with Chinese culture and Chinese identity.

Controversies on origin 
The cheongsam is generally considered to be adapted from the one-piece dress of Manchu women during the Qing dynasty which survived from the 1911 Revolution surviving the political changes and improved until it has become the traditional dress for Chinese women. However, there has been considerable debate on the origin of the cheongsam in academic circles. The following are three common arguments on the origin of the cheongsam:

The first argument says that the cheongsam came directly from the clothing of the banner people when the Manchu ruled China during the Qing dynasty. This argument was prominently represented by Zhou Xibao in his work The History of Ancient Chinese Clothing and Ornaments.

The second opinion holds that the cheongsam inherited some features of the chángpáo of Banner People in the Qing dynasty, but the true origin of the cheongsam dates back to a period between the Western Zhou dynasty (1046–771 BC) and the pre-Qin era, approximately two millennia before the Qing dynasty. According to Yuan Jieying's book Chinese Cheongsam, the modern cheongsam shares many similarities with the narrow-cut straight skirt that women wore in the Western Zhou dynasty. And Chinese Professor Bao Minxin also pointed out in his book A Real Record of Modern Chinese Costume that the cheongsam originated from the ancient robe in the Han dynasty (206 BC-220 AD). The robe is a one-piece upper and lower connected long dress which was quite popular among ladies in Han.

The third argument was raised by Bian Xiangyang in his book An Analysis on the Origin of Qipao. Bian thinks that the cheongsam originates from neither the robe nor the chángpáo. It is an adaption of Western-style dress during the Republic of China era when people were open to the Western cultures. In his opinion, the cheongsam was a hybrid of traditional Chinese costumes and Western costumes such as the waistcoat and one-piece dress. Moreover, according to him, Chinese women traditionally wore  trousers under their clothing and the use of silk stockings under the cheongsam or being bare legs is not a Chinese tradition but the result of Western influence.

Similar garments 
The Vietnamese áo dài looks similar to the cheongsam as they both consist of a long robe with side splits on both sides of the robe with one of the main difference typically being the height of the side split.

The áo dài was developed from the clothing worn in Chinese court but it could only be worn by the royalty originally. The áo dài was derived from áo ngũ thân (lit. 'five-panel gown') which was a Nguyễn court fashion which drew strong influences from the civil and military official clothing practices used in China; the áo dài also evolved from the early prototypes decreed by Nguyễn Phúc Khoát.

In the 18th century, in an attempt to separate his domain from Tonkin ruled by his rival Trịnh clan and build an independent state, Lord Nguyễn Phúc Khoát (reigned 1738–1765) forced his subjects to wear Ming dynasty style Chinese clothing. The ethnic Kinh robe (i.e. the traditional áo giao lĩnh, a type of crossed-collar robe, which was identical to the ones worn by the Han Chinese) was, therefore, replaced by a robe with Chinese-style fasteners, which was buttoned in the front, and had an upright collar. The skirt which was worn by the Vietnamese was also replaced by trousers under his rule. This form of new fashion became the prototype of the áo dài; it was a form of áo ngũ thân which was invented by Lord Nguyễn Phúc Khoá; the áo ngũ thân also had 5 flaps instead of 4 (the 5th flap was small and was found under the front garment) and 5 buttons. Another new form of fashion included a type of four-panel robe which was described by Lê Quý Đôn as an áo dài which was loose fitting similarly to the áo giao lãnh. Under the rule of Emperor Minh Mang, two new forms of áo dài were created from the áo ngũ thân regulated by Nguyễn Phúc Khoát: the áo tứ thân, and the Huế-style áo dài which was created with five flaps. The Huế-style áo dài represented royal court culture of the Huế and later developed influenced the modern áo dài.

See also 
 Hanfu
 Mao suit
 Chinese clothing
 Qizhuang
 Chinoiserie in fashion
 Qungua

Gallery

References

Citations

Sources 

 
 
 
 
 
 
 
  About a tailor of cheongsam who has been in the business for nearly 80 years.

External links 

 About.com entry  on the qipao

Dresses
17th-century fashion
18th-century fashion
19th-century fashion
20th-century fashion
Chinese traditional clothing
Chinese words and phrases
History of clothing (Western fashion)
History of fashion
History of Asian clothing